The New Zealand Radio Awards are the annual awards of the New Zealand radio industry. Organised by the Radio Broadcasters Association, the awards recognise excellence in commercial and non-commercial radio broadcasting, in the form of programming, personalities, news and sports reporting, creativity and production quality. New Zealand radio stations, radio staff, advertising agencies and production houses are eligible to enter the awards.

The awards began in 1978, with the beginning of deregulation of the radio industry and the emergence of new independent broadcasters under the third National government of Rob Muldoon. Non-commercial and commercial networks have competed for a range of awards recognising both public service and commercial success. Special categories have also been developed to recognise Māori broadcasting and programmes for ethnic minorities, particularly on Iwi Radio Network and Access Radio Network stations.

Awards
Below is a summation of some of the awards presented each year, from 2011 onwards.

References